Robert Herron (September 23, 1924 – October 10, 2021) was an American stuntman and actor, best known for  performing stunts in hundreds of Hollywood films between 1950 and 2011.

Herron was born in Lomita, California in September 1924. He began his career in the early 1950s, appearing in films and television series as an actor and as a stunt performer. His work includes The Ten Commandments (1956), Rio Bravo (1959), Spartacus (1960), The Absent-Minded Professor (1961), The Wild Bunch (1969), Shaft (1971), Diamonds Are Forever (1971) and Rocky (1976).

He died from complications of a fall on October 10, 2021, at the age of 97.

References

External links

1924 births
2021 deaths
American male film actors
American stunt performers
People from Lomita, California
Accidental deaths from falls
20th-century American male actors